Mike Ariey is a former offensive tackle in the National Football League.

Biography
Ariey was born Michael August Ariey on March 12, 1964 in Bakersfield, California. He currently owns a catering company.

Playing career
Ariey played with the Green Bay Packers during the 1989 NFL season. He also played for the New York Giants before the Green Bay Packers. He played at the collegiate level at San Diego State University.

See also
List of Green Bay Packers players

References

Players of American football from Bakersfield, California
Green Bay Packers players
American football offensive tackles
San Diego State Aztecs football players
Living people
1964 births